Gmina Turobin is a rural gmina (administrative district) in Biłgoraj County, Lublin Voivodeship, in eastern Poland.

Villages
Gmina Turobin contains the villages and settlements of Czernięcin Główny, Czernięcin Poduchowny, Elizówka, Gaj Czernięciński, Gródki, Guzówka-Kolonia, Huta Turobińska, Nowa Wieś, Olszanka, Polesiska, Przedmieście Szczebrzeszyńskie, Rokitów, Tarnawa Duża, Tarnawa Mała, Tarnawa-Kolonia, Tokary, Turobin, Wólka Czernięcińska, Zabłocie, Żabno, Żabno-Kolonia, Zagroble, Załawcze, and Żurawie.

Neighbouring gminas
Gmina Turobin is bordered by the gminas of Chrzanów, Goraj, Radecznica, Rudnik, Sułów, Wysokie, Zakrzew, and Żółkiewka.

References
Polish official population figures 2006

Turobin
Biłgoraj County